"Trigger Inside" is a song by Northern Irish rock band Therapy?, released as a single on 28 February 1994 through A&M Records. It is included on the band's second major-label album, Troublegum (1994). The single reached number 22 on the ]]UK Singles Chart]] and number 16 on the Irish Singles Chart. The single was released on CD, CD digipak, 12-inch vinyl, yellow 7-inch vinyl, and cassette.

Track listings

12-inch single

Personnel
 Andy Cairns: vocals, guitar
 Fyfe Ewing: drums
 Michael McKeegan: bass
 Chris Sheldon: producer on "Trigger Inside"
 John Robb: producer on "Nice N' Sleazy", "Reuters", "Tatty Seaside Town"
 Jonathan Barrett: engineer on "Nice N' Sleazy", "Reuters", "Tatty Seaside Town"

Charts

References

1994 singles
1994 songs
Therapy? songs
Songs written by Andy Cairns
Song recordings produced by Chris Sheldon
A&M Records singles